Richard Gregory Samaranayake (12 November 1923 - 18 June 1992) was a Ceylonese planter and politician.

Richard Gregory Samaranayake was born on 12 November 1923, the eldest son of Hettiarachchige Don Saman Samaranayake of Mirigama. He was educated at Royal College, Colombo. He possesses a Diploma in Agriculture. 

He contested the 4th parliamentary election, held on 19 March 1960, as the United National Party candidate in the newly created electorate of Bentara-Elpitiya. He defeated the Mahajana Eksath Peramuna candidate, Albert Kariyawasam, by 592 votes. At the subsequent 5th parliamentary election, held on 20 July 1960, Samaranayake lost to Kariyawasam, who now represented the Sri Lanka Freedom Party by 5,987 votes.

At the 6th parliamentary elections, held on 22 March 1965, Samaranayake received 22,085 votes (49% of the total vote) defeating the sitting member, Kariyawasam, by 5,987 votes. In November 1965 an Election Judge ruled the election result void, on the grounds that a sub-agent of Samaranayake, Soma Withanachchi, made false and misleading statements (allegations of bribery by Kariyawasam) at a election campaign meeting on 5 March 1965. A subsequent appeal by Samaranayake was dismissed on 1 August 1966 and the original decision was upheld. At the subsequent parliamentary by-election, held on 24 October 1966, his brother, Colin Wijesekera, ran in his place but was defeated by Kariyawasam by 1,677 votes.

Samaranayake married Irene Jirasinghe, the daughter of Reggie F. Jirasinghe and D. C. Wijesundere, they had two children.

References 

1923 births
1992 deaths
Alumni of Royal College, Colombo
Members of the 4th Parliament of Ceylon
Members of the 6th Parliament of Ceylon
Members of the 8th Parliament of Sri Lanka
Sinhalese politicians
Sri Lanka Freedom Party politicians
Sri Lankan Buddhists
United National Party politicians